This is the discography for American jazz musician Wes Montgomery.

Discography

As leader

With The Montgomery Brothers 

Compilations
 Beginnings (Blue Note, 1975)[2LP] – BN LA 531
 Fingerpickin (Pacific Jazz, 1996)
 Far Wes (Pacific Jazz, 1990)

Collaborations 
 Bags Meets Wes! with Milt Jackson (Riverside, 1962) 
 Smokin' at the Half Note with The Wynton Kelly Trio (Verve, 1965)
 Jimmy & Wes: The Dynamic Duo with Jimmy Smith (Verve, 1966)
 Further Adventures of Jimmy and Wes with Jimmy Smith (Verve, 1969)

As sideman 
 Cannonball Adderley, Cannonball Adderley and the Poll Winners (Riverside, 1961)
 Nat Adderley, Work Song (Riverside, 1960)
 Jon Hendricks, A Good Git-Together (World Pacific, 1959)
 Harold Land, West Coast Blues! (Jazzland, 1960)
 The Mastersounds, Kismet (World Pacific, 1958)

 Wes Montgomery, Complete Recordings with Lionel Hampton (Definitive, 2002)(2CD) – compilation with Lionel Hampton

References

External links 
 
 

Jazz discographies
Discographies of American artists